Charlie Deutsch is a British National Hunt jockey.

Racing career
Deutsch began his racing career with Charlie Longsdon in 2013 before moving across to Venetia Williams in Herefordshire.  He fell in his first ride for Williams.  Deutsch won the Grade 3 Betfair Handicap Chase at Cheltenham with Aachen in 2015.  He would win the race again in 2021 with Commodore making him joint leading jockey in the race.  In 2016, Deutsch won the Lanzarote Hurdle at Kempton Park with Yala Enki.  The jockey stated it as his biggest win at the time.

Deutsch was arrested in 2018 for drink driving. At this point of his career, he had won 88 races.

His first ride after release from prison was Rogue Dancer at Huntingdon Racecourse on 16 October 2018. He finished 2nd. At the 2019 Cheltenham Festival, Deutsch nearly won his first Festival race in the Ryanair Chase with Aso, finishing second to Frodon. At the 2019 November meeting at Cheltenham he won the Leading Jockey award sponsored by Ariat.

Deutsch built a solid partnership with L'Homme Presse, winning a number of Grade 2 Races.  He would go on to win two Grade 1 races - The Scilly Isles Novices Chase, and the Brown Advisory Novices Chase which would be his first Cheltenham Festival winner.

Major wins
 Great Britain
 Brown Advisory Novices Chase - L'Homme Presse (2022)
 Scilly Isles Novices' Chase - L'Homme Presse (2022)

Cheltenham Festival winners (1)
 Brown Advisory Novices Chase - L'Homme Presse (2022)

Personal life
Deutsch is based in Tewkesbury and in his youth was a keen huntsman with Heythrop.  He was also a member of the Pony Club.

Criminal Conviction and Prison Sentence
On 30 March 2018, Deutsch was arrested following a 5 mile police chase in his Audi A4, after being initially stopped for speeding and possible driving under the influence of alcohol.  During the chase, he reached speeds over 110 mph. He evaded police but was caught using a police stinger. In May 2018, he pleaded guilty to dangerous driving while over the legal alcohol limit and escaping from police custody.  He was sentenced to 10 months in prison.  He served two and a half months of his sentence at HM Prison Bristol before being released.<

References

Living people
English jockeys
Sportspeople convicted of crimes
Year of birth missing (living people)